Tyshun Scott Render (born March 28, 1997) is an American football defensive end for the New Jersey Generals of the United States Football League (USFL). He played college football at Middle Tennessee.

Professional career
After playing four years at Middle Tennessee, Render was signed by the Miami Dolphins as an undrafted free agent on April 25, 2020. He was waived during final roster cuts on September 5, 2020, and signed to the practice squad two days later. He was elevated to the active roster on October 10 and December 12 for the team's weeks 5 and 14 games against the San Francisco 49ers and Kansas City Chiefs, and reverted to the practice squad after each game. He was placed on the practice squad/COVID-19 list by the team on December 17, 2020, and restored to the practice squad on December 30. He signed a reserve/future contract with the Dolphins on January 5, 2021.

On August 31, 2021, Render was waived by the Dolphins.

New Jersey Generals
On March 10, 2022, Render was drafted by the New Jersey Generals of the United States Football League.

References

External links
Miami Dolphins bio
Middle Tennessee Blue Raiders bio

1997 births
Living people
African-American players of American football
American football defensive ends
Miami Dolphins players
Middle Tennessee Blue Raiders football players
People from Newnan, Georgia
Players of American football from Georgia (U.S. state)
Sportspeople from the Atlanta metropolitan area
21st-century African-American sportspeople
New Jersey Generals (2022) players